Eyes Adrift (known in Australia as Bud, Curt & Krist) was a three-piece rock supergroup consisting of Krist Novoselic (bass guitar, formerly of Nirvana), Curt Kirkwood (guitar and lead vocals, of Meat Puppets),  and Bud Gaugh (drums, formerly of Sublime and Long Beach Dub Allstars). They released a self-titled album in 2002, which was a mixture of punk, grunge, and country, taking all of their previous backgrounds and putting them together. They toured the United States in mid-2002. They later broke up in 2003, after their debut album flopped. Kirkwood and Gaugh went on to form the supergroup band known as Volcano. The album is currently out of print. Novoselic went on to record songs with Foo Fighters and become a political activist in Seattle, Washington, before forming Giants in the Trees.

In Australia, there was another group called "Eyes Adrift", and rather than pay to license that name, the trio called the band and album "Bud, Curt & Krist".

Discography

Self-titled album

Eyes Adrift (Bud, Curt & Krist in Australia), the band's only album, was released on September 24, 2002. "Alaska" was the album's only single, released on March 3, 2003 in the UK.

Track listing
 "Sleight of Hand" – 4:11
 "Alaska" – 2:51
 "Inquiring Minds" – 2:46
 "Untried" – 3:56
 "Blind Me" – 4:01
 "Dottie Dawn & Julie Jewel" – 3:04
 "Solid" – 3:37
 "Pyramids" – 5:13
 "Telescope" – 4:06
 "Slow Race" – 5:00
 "What I Said" – 4:34
 "Pasted" – 15:33

"Inquiring Minds" is dedicated to JonBenét Ramsey.

The Japanese edition of the album, released on January 29, 2003 includes two additional tracks; "Son of Pasted" (also known as "The Jerk") and "The Cup & The Lip".

"Alaska" single
The CD single to "Alaska", released on December 2, 2003 includes the tracks: "The Jerk" and "The Cup & the Lip".

Personnel
 Krist Novoselic – bass guitar, lead vocals on "Inquiring Minds", "Dottie Dawn & Julie Jewel" and "Pasted"
 Curt Kirkwood – guitar, lead vocals on "Sleight Of Hand", "Alaska", "Untried", "Blind Me", "Solid", "Pyramids", "Telescope", "Slow Race" and "What I Said"
 Bud Gaugh – drums, percussion, synthesizer
 Jimmy Shortell – trumpet on "Sleight of Hand"
 John Plymale - Mix Engineer

References

External links
Meat Puppets collection at the Internet Archive's live music archive
Meat Puppets Live Repository

2002 establishments in the United States
American alternative country groups
American alternative rock groups
Cowpunk musical groups
Musical groups established in 2002
Supergroups (music)
SpinART Records artists